The Galway Cup is an association football National Youth Tournament held annually in Galway, Ireland. The tournament takes place in Salthill Devon F.C.'s Drom Soccer Park venue.

History
The competition began in the summer of 2005 in a bid to bring the international football scene to Ireland. Over 40 teams representing seven nations participated in the inaugural tournament. Academy teams of such football clubs as Celtic F.C., Preston North End F.C., Shelbourne F.C., Fulham F.C., Sheffield United F.C., Newcastle United F.C., Leeds United F.C., Aberdeen F.C., Leicester City F.C., Ipswich Town F.C., Derry City F.C., Glentoran F.C., Belvedere, MŠK Žilina, Cherry Orchard F.C. and also Football Association of Ireland youth selection  have competed. The tournament includes age groups from Under-11 to Under-17 and there is a group for a girls' Under-15 tournament. Now the youth competition has gone from strength to strength and is recognized as one of the best youth tournaments in Europe. The tournament highlights are broadcast on Setanta Sports.

Past winners

2005

2006

2007

2008

2009

2010

External links
 Tournament history
 Official Website

Youth football competitions
Association football in County Galway
Association football cup competitions in the Republic of Ireland
Youth association football in the Republic of Ireland
Salthill Devon F.C.
Association football cup competitions in Connacht